is a Japanese football player currently playing for Tokyo Verdy.

Club statistics
Updated to 19 July 2022.

References

External links

Profile at Ehime FC
Profile at JEF United Chiba

1987 births
Living people
Association football people from Saitama Prefecture
Japanese footballers
J1 League players
J2 League players
Urawa Red Diamonds players
Thespakusatsu Gunma players
Mito HollyHock players
Tokyo Verdy players
Yokohama FC players
JEF United Chiba players
Ehime FC players
Association football midfielders